Slaveryinamerica is a website archive of the history of slavery in America. It is jointly funded by PBS and New York Life.
Slavery was being practiced throughout America in the 17th and 18th century, and the slaves built the foundation of the new nation.

References

External links
 Slaveryinamerica.org

Pre-emancipation African-American history
History websites of the United States